Ian Hogg may refer to:

Ian Hogg (actor) (born 1937), English actor
Ian Hogg (Royal Navy officer) (1911–2003)
Ian V. Hogg (1926–2002), Royal Artillery officer and author
Ian Hogg (footballer) (born 1989), New Zealand footballer